Hughes Manor, also known as White House Manor, located near Middletown, Ohio, was built in 1889.  It was listed on the National Register of Historic Places in 1994.

It was listed on the NRHP for its architecture.  It includes Greek Revival, Stick/Eastlake, and Queen Anne architecture.

The  listed area included 5 contributing buildings and one contributing structure. Historic functions served by its buildings include serving as a single dwelling, as a secondary structure, and as agricultural outbuildings.

References

Houses on the National Register of Historic Places in Ohio
Queen Anne architecture in Ohio
Greek Revival houses in Ohio
Stick-Eastlake architecture in the United States
Houses completed in 1889
Houses in Butler County, Ohio
National Register of Historic Places in Butler County, Ohio